IINA is a free and open-source media player software based on mpv and written in Swift for macOS. It is released under the GNU General Public License version 3 (GPLv3).

References

External links 
 

Free media players
macOS media players
macOS-only free software